Penhale is a village in Cornwall, United Kingdom. It is about six miles (10 km) east-southeast of Newquay and ten miles (16 km) west-southwest of Bodmin.

The village is on the course of the A30 trunk road. The road used to run through the village but is now re-routed half-a-mile south as a dual carriageway bypass.

Penhale is in the civil parish of St Enoder and the nearest villages are St Columb Road and Indian Queens.

References

External links

Villages in Cornwall